William Humphries Stephens (1739–c.1820)  was an 18th/19th century British sculptor.

Life
He was born in 1739 the son of Joseph Stephens, a stonecutter in Worcester. He was apprenticed to his father in 1751 and became a Freeman mason in 1760. He initially in partnership with a Mr Bott and early works are signed Bott & Stephens.

Around 1787 his son Joseph Stephens joined as an apprentice and became a junior partner around 1794.

Works

Under Apprenticeship
Tomb of Thomas Parker in Longden (1751)

Bott & Stephens
Memorial to Richard Carwardine at St John's Church in Bedwardine (1763)

Stephens & Co
Monument to William Hankins at Dymock (1771)
Monument to Thomas Dunn in All Saints Church in Evesham (1777)
Memorial to Arthur Charlett in Fladbury (1779)
Monument to Robert Bateson in Bourton-on-the-Water (1779)
Monument to Robert Woodward in Worcester Cathedral (1780)
Monument to Sarah Hall in Ledbury (1780)
Monument to Mary Astley in Worcester Cathedral (1782)
Monument to William Bach in Leominster (1785)
Memorial to Rev Hudson Boyce at Fladbury (1786)
Monument to Patience Turner in All Saints Church in Worcester (1786)
Monument to Rev James Gyles at Powick (1792)
Monument to Mary and Richard Clarke in Gloucester Cathedral (1792)
Monument to Jonathan Green in Ashford Bowdler (1792)
Monument to John Williams in All Saints Church in Worcester (1793)
Memorial to Mary Hall in Worcester Cathedral (1794)
Monument to Rev George Martin in Overbury (1796)
Monument to Daniel Ellis in Elmore, Gloucestershire (1797)
Monument to Joseph Berwick in St Nicholas Church in Worcester (1798)
Memorial to Bishop Hurd in Worcester Cathedral (1808)
Memorial to Lord Somers at Eastnor, Herefordshire (1808)

References
 

1739 births
Artists from Worcester, England
English sculptors